KMBS may refer to:

 KMBS (AM), a radio station (1310 AM) licensed to West Monroe, Louisiana, United States
 Kanpur Metropolitan Bus Service
 Kuwait Maastricht Business School
 MBS International Airport (ICAO:KMBS), in Freeland, Michigan, United States